John Francis Bushelman (August 29, 1885 – October 26, 1955) was a Major League Baseball pitcher who played for the Cincinnati Reds and Boston Red Sox. He batted and threw right-handed.

Bushelman attended the University of Cincinnati. He started his professional baseball career in 1906 in Winnipeg and made his major league debut late in the 1909 season. He pitched a complete game but lost.

From 1910 to 1914, Bushelman pitched mostly in the New England League. He played in six games for the Red Sox as well, but he did not distinguish himself enough to stick in the majors. In total, Bushelman posted a 1–2 record in 26.2 innings pitched in the major leagues. In 1913, he led the NENL in wins, with 26. He retired after the 1915 season.

External links

 

1885 births
1955 deaths
Major League Baseball pitchers
Boston Red Sox players
Cincinnati Bearcats baseball players
Cincinnati Reds players
Winnipeg Maroons (baseball) players
New Bedford Whalers (baseball) players
Worcester Busters players
Baseball players from Cincinnati
Nashville Vols players
Portsmouth Cobblers players